Flight 961 may refer to

Ethiopian Airlines Flight 961, crashed on 23 November 1996
Air Transat Flight 961, structural failure on 6 March 2005

0961